Audrey Demoustier (born 17 March 1985) is a Belgian football midfielder, currently playing for White Star Woluwe of the First Division.

She is a member of the Belgian national team.

Biography 
Demoustier started here senior career at FCF Braine where she played for 5 seasons. She left Braine for White Star Woluwe where she only stayed for 2 seasons. She left Woluwe for Standard Liège where she played until 2016. With standard she played Champions league, promoted to the BeNe League and, when the BeNe League was disbanded, the Super League. In 2016 she left Standard for again Woluwe that now plays in the First Division.

Champions League 
Demoustier played with Standard Liège for 13 Champions League games. In the six times she competed, only one time was the team unable to participate in the main tournament. They did not get past the qualification round as they lost the first game, 1–3, against Minsk. They did better in the second game and won, 11–0, against ŽFK Dragon 2014. But in the last game they couldn't get any further than a 1–1 draw against ŽNK Osijek.

BeNe League 
When the BeNe League first saw light at the start of season 2012-13, Standard Liège was there from start until the end at season 2014-15. Demoustier played in those 3 seasons a total of 57 games for a total of 3946 minutes and scored 11 goals.

Super League 
In her last season for Standard Liège she played the Super League level. She made 12 appearances for a total of 861 minutes and scored 3 goals.

Statistics

Club

International

Youth

Seniors

Awards 
 Belgium Champion (7):
 2008-09
 2010-11
 2011-12
 2012-13
 2013-14
 2014-15
 2015-16
 BeNe League Champion (1):
 2014-15
 Winner Belgian Cup (2):
 2011-12
 2013-14
 Runner-up Belgian Cup (1):
 2008-09
 Winner Belgian Super Cup (3):
 2008-09
 2010-11
 2011-12
 Winner BeNe Super Cup (2):
 2010-11
 2011-12

References

1985 births
Living people
Belgian women's footballers
People from Chimay
Women's association football midfielders
Belgium women's international footballers
Standard Liège (women) players
BeNe League players
Super League Vrouwenvoetbal players
Footballers from Hainaut (province)
Belgium women's youth international footballers